This is a complete list of former presidents of the Philippines who pursued public office after their presidential terms ended.

According to Article 7 Section 4 of the 1987 Constitution, the president "shall not be eligible for any reelection" and that, "no person who has succeeded as president and has served as such for more than four years shall be qualified for election to the same office at any time". The previous 1973 constitution provided no limit while the 1935 constitution provided only one reelection. The term limit has prevented any incumbent president to run again for the same office; one exception was Gloria Macapagal Arroyo, who has served for 3 and a half years prior to her election in 2004.

For executive posts

Presidency
This list only includes former presidents (those who are not in position anymore and seeking for a comeback) who ran again for president.

Local government
List of presidents who run in a local executive position

For legislative posts

Senate
List of presidents who run as a lawmaker at the Senate after the presidency:

House of Representatives
List of presidents who run as a lawmaker at the House of Representatives after the presidency:

References

Philippines
Lists of presidents of the Philippines